Alanta Manor is a former residential manor in Naujasodis, Molėtai district.

References

Manor houses in Lithuania
Neoclassical architecture in Lithuania